Wang Hu may refer to:

Uicheon (1055–1101), Buddhist monk and Munjong of Goryeo's son, born Wang Hu
Grand Prince Danyang ( 14th century), Goryeo royalty
Wang Hu (China) (1865–1933), politician during the Qing and Republican periods